The 2nd Caucasus Cossack Division was a Cossack Division of the Imperial Russian Army before and during World War I.

Commanders 
 1879–1881: Ivane Amilakhvari
 1903: Ivan Makarovich Orbeliani
 1906–1907: Maksud Alihhanov-Avarski
 1910–1912: Sergey N Fleisher
 1912–1916: Dmitry Abatsiyev

Chiefs of Staff 
 1904–1907: NI Arapov
 1907–1909: Vladimirov
 1909–1915: Jewgienij Lebiedinski
 1915–1916: Pavel Chatilov
 1916–1917: Sergey Markov

External links 
 2-я Кавказская казачья дивизия, Regiment.ru

Cavalry divisions of the Russian Empire
Cossack military units and formations